In thermodynamics, a critical point (or critical state) is the end point of a phase equilibrium curve. One example is the liquid–vapor critical point, the end point of the pressure–temperature curve that designates conditions under which a liquid and its vapor can coexist. At higher temperatures, the gas cannot be liquefied by pressure alone. At the critical point, defined by a critical temperature Tc and a critical pressure pc, phase boundaries vanish. Other examples include the liquid–liquid critical points in mixtures, and the ferromagnet–paramagnet transition (Curie temperature) in the absence of an external magnetic field.

Liquid–vapor critical point

Overview 

For simplicity and clarity, the generic notion of critical point is best introduced by discussing a specific example, the vapor–liquid critical point. This was the first critical point to be discovered, and it is still the best known and most studied one.

The figure to the right shows the schematic PT diagram of a pure substance (as opposed to mixtures, which have additional state variables and richer phase diagrams, discussed below). The commonly known phases solid, liquid and vapor are separated by phase boundaries, i.e. pressure–temperature combinations where two phases can coexist. At the triple point, all three phases can coexist. However, the liquid–vapor boundary terminates in an endpoint at some critical temperature Tc and critical pressure pc. This is the critical point.

In the vicinity of the critical point, the physical properties of the liquid and the vapor change dramatically, with both phases becoming even more similar. For instance, liquid water under normal conditions is nearly incompressible, has a low thermal expansion coefficient, has a high dielectric constant, and is an excellent solvent for electrolytes. Near the critical point, all these properties change into the exact opposite: water becomes compressible, expandable, a poor dielectric, a bad solvent for electrolytes, and prefers to mix with nonpolar gases and organic molecules.

At the critical point, only one phase exists. The heat of vaporization is zero. There is a stationary inflection point in the constant-temperature line (critical isotherm) on a PV diagram. This means that at the critical point:

 
 

Above the critical point there exists a state of matter that is continuously connected with (can be transformed without phase transition into) both the liquid and the gaseous state. It is called supercritical fluid. The common textbook knowledge that all distinction between liquid and vapor disappears beyond the critical point has been challenged by Fisher and Widom, who identified a p–T line that separates states with different asymptotic statistical properties (Fisher–Widom line).

Sometimes the critical point does not manifest in most thermodynamic or mechanical properties, but is "hidden" and reveals itself in the onset of inhomogeneities in elastic moduli, marked changes in the appearance and local properties of non-affine droplets, and a sudden enhancement in defect pair concentration.

History 

The existence of a critical point was first discovered by Charles Cagniard de la Tour in 1822 and named by Dmitri Mendeleev in 1860 and Thomas Andrews in 1869. Cagniard showed that CO2 could be liquefied at 31 °C at a pressure of 73 atm, but not at a slightly higher temperature, even under pressures as high as 3000 atm.

Theory 

Solving the above condition  for the van der Waals equation, one can compute the critical point as 
 
However, the van der Waals equation, based on a mean-field theory, does not hold near the critical point. In particular, it predicts wrong scaling laws.

To analyse properties of fluids near the critical point, reduced state variables are sometimes defined relative to the critical properties

 

The principle of corresponding states indicates that substances at equal reduced pressures and temperatures have equal reduced volumes. This relationship is approximately true for many substances, but becomes increasingly inaccurate for large values of pr.

For some gases, there is an additional correction factor, called Newton's correction, added to the critical temperature and critical pressure calculated in this manner. These are empirically derived values and vary with the pressure range of interest.

Table of liquid–vapor critical temperature and pressure for selected substances

Mixtures: liquid–liquid critical point 

The liquid–liquid critical point of a solution, which occurs at the critical solution temperature, occurs at the limit of the two-phase region of the phase diagram. In other words, it is the point at which an infinitesimal change in some thermodynamic variable (such as temperature or pressure) leads to separation of the mixture into two distinct liquid phases, as shown in the polymer–solvent phase diagram to the right. Two types of liquid–liquid critical points are the upper critical solution temperature (UCST), which is the hottest point at which cooling induces phase separation, and the lower critical solution temperature (LCST), which is the coldest point at which heating induces phase separation.

Mathematical definition 

From a theoretical standpoint, the liquid–liquid critical point represents the temperature–concentration extremum of the spinodal curve (as can be seen in the figure to the right). Thus, the liquid–liquid critical point in a two-component system must satisfy two conditions: the condition of the spinodal curve (the second derivative of the free energy with respect to concentration must equal zero), and the extremum condition (the third derivative of the free energy with respect to concentration must also equal zero or the derivative of the spinodal temperature with respect to concentration must equal zero).

See also 

 Conformal field theory
 Critical exponent
 Critical phenomena (more advanced article)
 Critical points of the elements (data page)
 Curie point
 Joback method, Klincewicz method, Lydersen method (estimation of critical temperature, pressure, and volume from molecular structure)
 Liquid–liquid critical point
 Lower critical solution temperature
 Néel point
 Percolation thresholds
 Phase transition
 Rushbrooke inequality
 Scale invariance
 Self-organized criticality
 Supercritical fluid, Supercritical drying, Supercritical water oxidation, Supercritical fluid extraction
 Tricritical point
 Triple point
 Upper critical solution temperature
 Widom scaling

References

Further reading 

 

Conformal field theory
Critical phenomena
Phase transitions
Renormalization group
Threshold temperatures
Gases